Miss Universe 1992, the 41st Miss Universe pageant, was held on 9 May 1992 at the Queen Sirikit National Convention Center in Bangkok, Thailand. Seventy-eight contestants competed in this year. Michelle McLean of Namibia was crowned by Lupita Jones of Mexico at the event's conclusion. This is the first and so far only time that Namibia won the pageant.

Results

Placements

Final competition

Special awards

Order of Announcements

Top 10

Top 6 

Top 3

Contestants

  - Laura Rafael
  - Yerusha Rasmijn
  - Georgina Denahy
  - Katrin Friedl
  - Fontella Chipman
  - Anke Van dermeersch
  - Colita Joseph
  - Natasha Gabriel Arana †
  - Maria Carolina Otto
  - Alicia Burke
  - Michaella Dinova Nikolova
  - Nicole Dunsdon
  - Yvette Peggy Jordison
  - Marcela Vacarezza
  - Lidia Kuborskaya
  - Paola Turbay 
  - Jeannine Tuavera
  - Jessica Manley Fredrich
  - Mijanou de Paula
  - Militsa Papadopolou
  - Michaela Maláčová
  - Anne Mette Voss
  - Ana Eliza González
  - Soledad Diab
  - Lamia Noshi
  - Melissa Salazar
  - Kirsi Syrjänen †
  - Linda Hardy
  - Monica Resch
  - Tiffany Stanford
  - Marina Tsintikidou
  - Cheryl Debra Payne
  - Nancy Maricela Perez
  - Monica Raquel Rapalo
  - Dora Patko
  - Svava Haraldsdóttir
  - Madhushree Sapre
  - Jane Thompson
  - Eynat Zmora
  - Bridgette Rhoden
  - Akiko Ando
  - Aisha Wawira Lieberg
  - Abeer Sharrouf
  - Carole Reding
  - Crystal Yong
  - Julienne Camilleri
  - Stephanie Raymond
  - Monica Zuñiga
  - Michelle McLean
  - Vivian Jansen
  - Lisa Maree de Montalk
  - Ida Patricia Delaney
  - Sandra Guenefred Petgrave
  - Imelda Antonio
  - Anne Sofie Galaen
  - Ana Cecilia Orillac
  - Pamela Zarza
  - Aline Arce Santos
  - Elizabeth Garcia Berroya
  - Izabela Filipowska
  - Maria Fernanda Silva
  - Daisy Garcia
  - Vivian Shih Hsiu Chieh
  - Corina Corduneanu
  - Cori Teo
  - Lee Young-hyun
  - Virginia García
  - Hiranthi Divapriya
  - Nancy Kasanngaloewar
  - Monica Brodd
  - Sandra Aegerter
  - Ornanong Panyawong
  - Elif Ilgaz
  - Barbara Johnson
  - Gabriela Escobar Ventura
  - Shannon Marketic
  - Cathy-Mae Sitaram
  - Carolina Izsak

Order of introduction
The following table is the order of introduction in the Parade of Nations segment in the regional groups, randomly-ordered.

Notes

Debuts

Returns
Last competed in 1987:
 
 

Last competed in 1989:
 

Last competed in 1990:

Replacements
  — Eynat Zmora, who represented Israel, placed first runner-up in the Miss Israel pageant but was sent to Miss Universe because the winner, Ravit Asaf, was under the age restriction of 18 years.
  — Julia Etina, Miss CIS 1992, did not compete in Miss Universe 1992, due to the fact that she had turned 18 years old after February 1. Her first runner-up of Miss CIS 1992, Lydia Kuborskaya went to Miss Universe instead of her. However, Etina got an official visit to the United States as sort of a consolation prize for missing the big event.
  — Jane Thompson, who represented Ireland, replaced Amanda Brunker, who was Miss Ireland 1991, due to the fact that Brunker was underaged before 1 February. However, Thompson was from Belfast in Northern Ireland.
   — Wu Pei Jun, Miss Universe Republic of China 1992, was underaged before 1 February. Her first runner-up, Liu Yu Hsin couldn't go either due to her health problems. So the chance was given to her second runner-up, Vivian Shih Hsiu Chieh, who went to the pageant instead.
  - Sofia Mazagatos, Miss España 1991, did not compete due to the fact that she was underaged before 1 February. Her first runner-up, Virginia García went instead of her. Mazagatos went only to Miss Europe 1992 pageant.

Withdrawals
 
 
  — Amy Kwok was expected to represent Hong Kong and even arrived in Bangkok, but was disqualified because she did not meet residency requirements. Kwok was a US resident who became the first overseas contestant to win the Miss Hong Kong title. The same issue came up again in Miss Universe 1996 when the winner Winnie Yeung was also a US citizen and she was disqualified. The 1st runner up in the pageant, Sofie Rahman was her replacement.
  - Gloria Zanin, Miss Italia 1992 rejected to compete at Miss Universe 1992 in order to boost her career as an actress and model locally. Therefore, this is Italy's first ever withdrawal at Miss Universe since its exception in 1952, they would only withdrew again in 2006.
  - Lack of Sponsorship.
  – Collapsed in 1991, split into fifteen countries. The titleholder of Miss USSR 1991, Ilmira Shamsuttinova later competed in 1996 as Miss Russia.
  – Rachel Charles was underage before 1 February. She competed in 1993 instead.
  – Due to the breakup in April, also wars and political crisis. Returned in 1998.

Did not compete
  - Ornella Costa

Name Changes
  competed as Great Britain again for the second time after 1952.
  competed as China / Taiwan for the first and only time, as Thailand recognized Taiwan as part of People's Republic of China and not a sovereign state.

Host city
Thailand anticipated holding the pageant as early as August 1991, when thousands of slum dwellers were evicted in order to improve the image of the city prior to a World Bank conference that was held in the city in October and the pageant.

The official announcement that Bangkok would host the pageant was made in December 1991, with the date initially set as 16 May. In March the date was moved back to 8 May so that it would not clash with Wisakha Bucha Day, a Buddhist holiday.

Political crisis
The pageant was held amidst a political crisis in Thailand that culminated on 17 May in the Black May protests against the government of General Suchinda Kraprayoon. The day prior to the event the public relations director expressed fears that the show might have to be cancelled if the situation escalated, although the threat was played down by other pageant officials.

General references

References

External links
 Miss Universe official website

1992
1992 in Thailand
1992 beauty pageants
Beauty pageants in Thailand
Events in Bangkok
May 1992 events in Asia